The phrase "new world order" in the Baháʼí Faith refers to the replacement of the collective political norms and values of the 19th century with a new system of worldwide governance that incorporates the Baháʼí ideals of unity and justice for all nations, races, creeds, and classes. The idea of world unification, both politically and spiritually, is at the heart of Baháʼí teachings.

Baháʼu'lláh taught that the future order will be the embodiment of God's scheme for mankind, the end goal of which is the emergence of the "Most Great Peace". Later on his successors, ʻAbdu'l-Bahá and Shoghi Effendi, interpreted "unification of mankind" as the eventual establishment of a world commonwealth, later as a democratic elected world government based on principles of equity and justice. Before the "Most Great Peace", Baháʼu'lláh envisioned a "Lesser Peace", a condition of unity and peace between countries established by governments rather than the Baháʼí community.

The Baháʼí vision of a New World Order has been described as related to utopianism. Baháʼí author Joseph Sheppherd emphasises the balance between unity and diversity in the Baháʼí system, stating that in the New world order "the cultural identity and diversity of individuals must be protected, respected and valued as integral to the whole" so as to avoid the extreme of unity leading to uniformity.

See also 

 Baháʼí International Community
 Democratic globalization
 Dispensation of the fulness of times
 Futures studies
 Global justice
 New world order (politics)
 The Promise of World Peace
 The Secret of Divine Civilization
 Utopia
 World federalism
 World to come

Notes

Further reading 
Danesh, Roshan (2008). Church and State in the Bahá'í Faith:An Epistemic Approach, in Journal of Law and Religion, 24:1, pages 21-63.

Bahá'í terminology
Bahá'í belief and doctrine
Federalism
Global citizenship
World government